Canal 12 is the state public television network of the Mexican state of Colima. It is operated by the Instituto Colimense de Radio y Televisión (ICRTV) and broadcasts local and national educational and cultural programs.

History
On June 3, 1989, XHAMO-TV, then known as "Tevecolima", was created by decree in the state's official newspaper. Its first test transmissions, then on channel 12, occurred on June 25, 1989, with the first official broadcasts the next day.

On June 26, 1994, XHAMO moved from channel 12 to 11 in order to avoid interference with new station XHCKW-TV channel 13. XHAMO would return to branding as channel 12 in 2016 as a consequence of the national clearing of channel 11 for its exclusive use by the IPN's Canal Once.

On February 10, 2007, XHAMO and Tevecolima were combined with the Instituto de la Radio Colimense to form ICRTV.

In December 2015, XHAMO began digital transmissions on the same physical channel 11, broadcasting at night until the analog shutoff on December 31, 2015. It was the second VHF digital television station to come to air in Mexico, after XHMTA-TDT in Matamoros, Tamaulipas.

A failure to file a timely renewal led to the Federal Telecommunications Institute (IFT) awarding a new concession, with the new templated call sign XHCPAL-TDT, to the state government starting on January 1, 2022.

On November 5, 2018, the IFT awarded the state government a concession to build channel 13 in Manzanillo, with call sign XHPBMZ-TDT, to rebroadcast Canal 12. In October 2021, an agreement was reached to co-site the transmitter with TV Azteca's facility, and the station launched on October 12.

References

Public television in Mexico
Television channels and stations established in 1989
Mass media in Colima City
Television stations in Colima
1989 establishments in Mexico